Legionella parisiensis is a Gram-negative bacterium from the genus Legionella which was isolated from cooling tower water in Paris.

References

External links
Type strain of Legionella parisiensis at BacDive -  the Bacterial Diversity Metadatabase

Legionellales
Bacteria described in 1985